Sylvio de Rezende (12 March 1918 – 19 April 1995) was a Brazilian equestrian. He competed in the individual dressage event at the 1972 Summer Olympics.

References

External links
 

1918 births
1995 deaths
Brazilian male equestrians
Brazilian dressage riders
Olympic equestrians of Brazil
Equestrians at the 1972 Summer Olympics
Place of birth missing